Daisy Quokka: World's Scariest Animal is a 2020 Australian 3D computer-animated comedy film directed by Ricard Cussó and written by Ryan Greaves. Financed by Screen Queensland and Screen Australia, it is the third and final film in Like a Photon Creative's The Tales from Sanctuary City franchise. The plot concerns the unbearably adorable but optimistic quokka named Daisy who has the impossible dream of winning the city's World's Scariest Animal competition. The film opened with a limited release in Australia in January 2021 due to the impact of the COVID-19 pandemic on cinemas and October 29, 2021 in the United States.

Cast 
Angourie Rice as Daisy Quokka
Sharnee Tones as Ronda Saltie
Sam Neill as Frankie Scales

Release and reception 
The film had its world premiere at the Children's International Film Festival (CHIFF) in Australia on 28 November 2020. Due to the impact of the COVID-19 pandemic on cinemas, Daisy Quokka opened in Australia with a limited release in January 2021, distributed by Odin Eye's Entertainment. It was released in the United Kingdom on 2 July, making $72,971 in its opening week for a total of $146,172. It has a worldwide total of $174,186.

References

External links 

The Tales from Sanctuary City
2020 films
2020 computer-animated films
2020s children's animated films
2020s Australian animated films
Australian children's films
Australian children's animated films
Australian computer-animated films
2020s English-language films
Australian animated feature films